The Mansfield Urban Area is a built-up area of Nottinghamshire, England. Which comprises the towns of Mansfield, Sutton in Ashfield, and Kirkby in Ashfield. It also includes the settlement of Mansfield Woodhouse and the village of Newstead. As well as  the village of New Houghton in Derbyshire. The 2011 census gives the total population of the area as 171,958 making it the 37th most populated urban area in England. The population has increased 9% from the 2001 census population of 158,114.

References

External links
Office for National Statistics: Census 2001, Key Statistics for urban areas
map depicting ONS definition

Geography of Nottinghamshire
Urban areas of England